Buxus colchica (syn. B. hyrcana) is a species of Buxus native to Azerbaijan, Georgia, Russia, and Turkey. It is threatened by habitat loss and defoliation by the caterpillars of an introduced moth species, Cydalima perspectalis.

It is an evergreen shrub or small tree, very closely related to Buxus sempervirens, and commonly treated as a synonym of it. It does not differ from B. sempervirens in any visible character.

References

colchica
Flora of Azerbaijan
Flora of Georgia (country)
Flora of Russia
Flora of Turkey
Taxonomy articles created by Polbot